Charam County is in Kohgiluyeh and Boyer-Ahmad province, Iran. The capital of the county is Charam. At the 2006 census, the region's population (as Charam and Sarfaryab Districts of Kohgiluyeh County) was 36,238 in 7,013 households. The following census in 2011 counted 32,159 people in 7,514 households, by which time those districts had been separated from the county to form Charam County. At the 2016 census, the county's population was 33,543 in 8,890 households.

Administrative divisions

The population history and structural changes of Charam County's administrative divisions over three consecutive censuses are shown in the following table. The latest census shows two districts, four rural districts, and two cities.

References

 

Counties of Kohgiluyeh and Boyer-Ahmad Province